Cutaneous nerve of forearm may refer to:

 Lateral cutaneous nerve of forearm
 Medial cutaneous nerve of forearm
 Posterior cutaneous nerve of forearm